Nicholas Hamer (born August 30, 1991) is an American soccer player who currently plays for Kitsap Pumas in the Premier Development League.

Career

College and Amateur
Hamer spent his entire college career at Gonzaga University.  He made a total of 69 appearances for the Bulldogs and tallied six goals and nine assists.

He also played in the Premier Development League for Portland Timbers U23s, Puget Sound Gunners FC and Kitsap Pumas.

Professional
On June 25, Hamer, along with Hiroki Kobayashi and Mike Ramos, was loaned from Kitsap to USL club Seattle Sounders FC 2.  He made his professional debut that same night in a 1–0 victory over Real Monarchs SLC.

References

External links
Gonzaga Bulldogs bio

1991 births
Living people
American soccer players
Gonzaga Bulldogs men's soccer players
Portland Timbers U23s players
Puget Sound Gunners FC players
Kitsap Pumas players
Tacoma Defiance players
Association football midfielders
Soccer players from Washington (state)
USL League Two players
USL Championship players